Dubai Meydan City is a new development under construction in the Ras Al Khor area of Dubai, UAE. The project was launched on the eve of the 2007 Dubai World Cup. Meydan city is expected to be completed in 2020, while Meydan Racecourse officially opened on 27 March 2010.
The development includes hotels, sky-bubble restaurant, entertainment, clubs, a concourse plaza, IMAX movie theater, towers and a boat-house.

Attractions

Meydan Racecourse 

Meydan Racecourse is able to accommodate over 60,000 spectators in a 1 mile long grandstand. When not used for races it will serve as a business and conference integrated facility. A horse racing museum and gallery are also planned. The development also includes a 9-hole golf course.
The  Meydan Racecourse includes Meydan Marina, The Meydan the world's first 5-star trackside hotel with 285 rooms, 2 race tracks and the Grandstand, which comprises a hotel, restaurants, a racing museum and 72 corporate suites for entertaining throughout the year. Meydan Free Zone also operates from the premises of the hotel.

Meydan One

Meydan One was announced in August 2015. It is a luxury district with a large scope of work. Covering an area of  it will feature a mall (the Meydan One Mall), a 711 meter tall Dubai One Tower (billed now as the tallest residential tower in the world), a civic plaza and a 4 kilometer canal and marina with 100 berths. The project will be located in the area extending between Medyan Hotel and Al Khail Road and will be developed by Meydan City Corporation. Phase One of the project is expected to be completed by 2020 at the time that Dubai will host the Expo 2020.

Dubai One Tower

Announced in August 2015, the Dubai One Tower (part of Meydan One District) is expected to be the world's tallest residential tower when complete. The tower will feature 885 residential apartments and a five star hotel with 350 rooms. The building will also feature a conference center, a 655 meter high observation deck, a 675 meter high restaurant and will be close to the proposed Meydan One Marina Yacht Club.

Horizons
Horizons is a  residential development that consists of Meydan Gateway Towers, Meydan Tower, Horseshoe plaza, and Bathhouse Residences.

Metropolis
Metropolis is a  commercial development that consists of 17 office buildings built on a single pedestrian podium.

Millennium Estates
A gated residential haven of 198 luxury villas comes across as a visionary attempt to evoke and inspire the spirit of community living.

Godolphin Parks
Godolphin Parks includes the Godolphin Gateway Tower and a Mall.

Transportation
There are plans to build a tramline which will run from Meydan City to Meydan Racecourse and can carry around 10,000 people every hour.

See also
List of development projects in Dubai

References

External links
Official sites 
Ameinfo.com
Dubai-online.com
Zawya.com

Buildings and structures under construction in Dubai
Proposed skyscrapers in Dubai
Free-trade zones of the United Arab Emirates